Walking to New Orleans is a studio album by American guitarist and singer George Benson, released by Provogue Records on 26 April 2019. It is Benson's first recording since Inspiration: A Tribute to Nat King Cole, which was released in 2013.

Background
Benson made this album as a tribute to Fats Domino and Chuck Berry. In an interview, Benson said: ″I'm a great appreciator of the music made by both of those guys″; ″Chuck Berry was a great showman and a great musician, and Fats Domino cut nothing but hit after hit after hit″.

Track listing

Personnel 
 George Benson – guitar, vocals
 Rob McNelley – rhythm guitar 
 Kevin McKendree – acoustic piano
 Alison Prestwood – bass guitar 
 Greg Morrow – drums, percussion 
 Paulie Cerra – saxophone, baritone saxophone 
 Ron Dziubla – baritone saxophone, sax solos 
 Lee Thornburg – trumpet, horn arrangements 
 Jeff Bova – orchestral arrangements 
 The Bovaland Symphonic Orchestra – orchestra 
 Mahalia Barnes – backing vocals
 Prinnie Stevens – backing vocals
 Natasha Stuart – backing vocals

Production 
 Producer – Kevin Shirley 
 Executive Producer – George Benson
 Engineers – Austin Atwood, Mark DeCozio, Kevin Shirley and Vezi Tayyeb.
 Recorded at Ocean Way Nashville (Nashville, Tennessee); Brick Road Studios (Scottsdale, Arizona); The Cave (Malibu, California); Kensington Sound (Toronto, Canada).
 Mixed by Kevin Shirley at The Cave (Malibu, California).
 Mastered by Bob Ludwig at Gateway Mastering (Portland, Maine).
 Artwork – Roy Koch
 Photography – Austin Hargrave
 Management – Stephanie Gonzalez for Apropos Management.

Release history

References

George Benson albums
2019 albums